Anastasiia Vladimirovna Semenova (born 12 March 1999) is a Russian badminton player. She won her first international tournament in Lithuanian International tournament in the women's doubles event partnered with senior player Ekaterina Bolotova. In the singles event, she won the 2017 Hatzor International tournament in Israel, also doubles up her title in the women's doubles event with Ksenia Evgenova. Semenova was part of the Russian junior team that won the silver medal at the 2017 Mulhouse European Junior Championships.

Achievements

BWF International Challenge/Series (4 titles, 1 runner-up) 
Women's singles

Women's doubles

  BWF International Challenge tournament
  BWF International Series tournament
  BWF Future Series tournament

References

External links 
 
 

1999 births
Living people
Badminton players from Moscow
Russian female badminton players
21st-century Russian women